Thyestiida  is an order of bony-armored jawless fish in the extinct vertebrate class Osteostraci.

References

External links 

 Thyestiida at fossilworks.org (retrieved 21 April 2016)

Osteostraci
Prehistoric jawless fish orders